Kambakht ( meaning "cursed") is an upcoming Pakistani action comedy film directed by Hamza Ali Abbasi, and produced by Eyad Ibrahim and Sharmeen Khan. The film stars Humayun Saeed, Shafqat Cheema,  Agha Haris, Sheheryar Munawar Siddiqui, Saba Qamar and Sohai Ali Abro.

Plot 
Kambakht is about a middle-aged man from the backward areas of the Pakhtunkhwa, played by Hamza Ali Abbasi, and a young urban city-slicker, played by Shehreyar Munawar, who strike an unlikely and accidental friendship.

Cast 
 Humayun Saeed
 Shafqat Cheema
 Agha Haris 
 Sheheryar Munawar Siddiqui
 Saba Qamar
 Sohai Ali Abro
 Fizza Zehra
 Hamza Ali Abbasi
 Gohar Rasheed
 Salmaan Shaukat
 Humaira Ali
 Meezam Ali
 Rabi Mansoor
 Ahmed Cheema
 Atif Siddiqui
 Jalal Haider Khan
 Latif Sheikh
 Yousuf Bashir Qureshi
 Amal Saleh
 Faryal Mehmood

Production 
The film was produced under the banner Kahani Films. Film shooting began in May 2013 and was completed in June 2014. Post-production began in same month but it was delayed as director was busy attending Imran Khan's protest. In an interview with Dawn he said, "I admit, the shooting did get delayed because I was busy in  However, it is in post production now and we will hopefully be done with it by March and then hand it over to ARY to release it whenever they deem fit. I truly believe in this project. Entertainment without a message or moral is useless. Kambakht will make people laugh but also make people think."

Release
First look teaser was released on 7 February 2014 on ARY Digital Network.

References

External links 
 
 
 

Unreleased Pakistani films
Pakistani action comedy films
Urdu-language Pakistani films